Bohm may refer to:

 Bohm (surname)
 Bohm Dialogue, free-flowing group conversation

Physics
 Aharonov–Bohm effect of electromagnetic potential on a particle
 Bohm sheath criterion for a Debye sheath plasma layer
 Bohm diffusion of plasma in a magnetic field 
 Bohm interpretation of the configuration of particles

See also 
 Böhme (disambiguation)
 Böhm
 Boehm
 Baum